Douglas Kelly or Doug Kelly may refer to:

 Douglas Tynwald Kelly (1920–2006), Canadian politician
 Douglas F. Kelly, American theologian
 Doug Kelly (footballer) (born 1934), English professional footballer
 Doug Kelly (journalist), Canadian journalist

See also
Douglas Kelley (disambiguation)